Helmut Wieser (born 11 October 1953) is an Austrian modern pentathlete. He competed at the 1980 Summer Olympics.

References

1953 births
Living people
Austrian male modern pentathletes
Olympic modern pentathletes of Austria
Modern pentathletes at the 1980 Summer Olympics
People from Steyr
Sportspeople from Upper Austria
20th-century Austrian people